Diffusion-controlled (or diffusion-limited) reactions are reactions in which the reaction rate is equal to the rate of transport of the reactants through the reaction medium (usually a solution). The process of chemical reaction can be considered as involving the diffusion of reactants until they encounter each other in the right stoichiometry and form an activated complex which can form the product species. The observed rate of chemical reactions is, generally speaking, the rate of the slowest or "rate determining" step. In diffusion controlled reactions the formation of products from the activated complex is much faster than the diffusion of reactants and thus the rate is governed by collision frequency.

Diffusion control is rare in the gas phase, where rates of diffusion of molecules are generally very high. Diffusion control is more likely in solution where diffusion of reactants is slower due to the greater number of collisions with solvent molecules. Reactions where the activated complex forms easily and the products form rapidly are most likely to be limited by diffusion control. Examples are those involving catalysis and enzymatic reactions. Heterogeneous reactions where reactants are in different phases are also candidates for diffusion control.

One classical test for diffusion control is to observe whether the rate of reaction is affected by stirring or agitation; if so then the reaction is almost certainly diffusion controlled under those conditions.

Derivation
The following derivation is adapted from Foundations of Chemical Kinetics.
This derivation assumes the reaction . Consider a sphere of radius , centered at a spherical molecule A, with reactant B flowing in and out of it.

If we assume a local steady state, then the rate at which B reaches  is the limiting factor and balances the reaction. 

Therefore, the steady state condition becomes 

1.  

where 

 is the flux of B, as given by Fick's law of diffusion, 

2. , 

where  is the diffusion coefficient and can be obtained by the Stokes-Einstein equation, and the second term is the gradient of the chemical potential with respect to position. Note that [B] refers to the average concentration of B in the solution, while [B](r) is the "local concentration" of B at position r.

Inserting 2  into 1 results in 

3. . 

It is convenient at this point to use the identity 
 allowing us to rewrite 3 as 

4. . 

Rearranging 4 allows us to write 

5. 

6. 
or

7.  (where)

For the reaction between A and B, there is an inherent reaction constant , so . Substitutiing this into 7 and rearranging yields 

8.

Limiting conditions

Very fast intrinsic reaction
Suppose  is very large compared to the diffusion process, so A and B react immediately.

9.

Weak intermolecular forces
If the forces that bind A and B together are weak, ie  for all r except very small r, . The reaction rate 9 simplifies even further to 

10.  
This equation is true for a very large proportion of industrially relevant reactions in solution.

Viscosity dependence
The Stokes-Einstein equation describes a frictional force on a sphere of diameter  as  where  is the viscosity of the solution.

See also 
 Diffusion limited enzyme

References 

Chemical reactions
Chemical reaction engineering
Chemical kinetics